Dunlop railway station serves the village of Dunlop in East Ayrshire, Scotland. The station is managed by ScotRail and is on the Glasgow South Western Line.

History 
The station was opened on 27 March 1871 by the Glasgow, Barrhead and Kilmarnock Joint Railway. The station closed on 7 November 1966 as part of the Beeching cuts, however the closure was only brief as it reopened as an unstaffed halt on 8 June 1967 after vehement local opposition and national press coverage.

Track doubling between Lugton and Lochridge Junction just south of Stewarton, started in 2008, has resulted in a second platform, disabled access and a new car park being built.

Services in 2019 

Spring 2021

Due to the ongoing COVID-19 pandemic 
Monday to Saturday services consist of a 30-minute service to Glasgow (1 calls Barrhead then express, the other is all stations) and to Kilmarnock(with limited extensions beyond to Carlisle and Stranraer
There is no service after 20:30
There is no Sunday service due to action by the RMT union

In 2012 a ticket machine was installed on Platform 2 and from December 2012, Sunday trains only use Platform 1.

Views of Dunlop station

References 
Notes

Sources

External links
Video footage of Dunlop railway station.
Dunlop Village and District in 1913.

Railway stations in East Ayrshire
Former Glasgow, Barrhead and Kilmarnock Joint Railway stations
Railway stations in Great Britain opened in 1871
Railway stations in Great Britain closed in 1966
Railway stations in Great Britain opened in 1967
Reopened railway stations in Great Britain
Railway stations served by ScotRail
Beeching closures in Scotland
SPT railway stations